Perittia nimbifera is a moth of the family Elachistidae that is endemic to South Africa.

References

Endemic moths of South Africa
Elachistidae
Moths described in 1913
Moths of Africa
Endemic fauna of South Africa